The 1985 Major League Baseball strike was the fifth work stoppage in Major League Baseball since the 1972 Major League Baseball strike. The strike lasted only two days, August 6 and 7.  Of the 25 games scheduled for those days, 23 were made up later in the season.

See also
 1985 Major League Baseball season

Notes

External links
Google Search (timeline)
Jan-Jun, 1985
Jul-Dec, 1985

Major League Baseball Strike, 1985
Major League Baseball labor disputes
Strike